Piense Sport Clube is a Portuguese sports club from Pias, Serpa.

The men's football team plays in the I league of AF Beja. The team previously played in the 1990–91 Terceira Divisão, as well as several editions of the Taça de Portugal in the 2010s.

References

Football clubs in Portugal
Association football clubs established in 1944
1944 establishments in Portugal